The 2006 Bulldogs RLFC season was the 72nd in the club's history. They competed in the NRL's 2006 Telstra Premiership, finishing the regular season 2nd out of 15 teams. They went on to come within one match of the grand final but were knocked out by eventual premiers the Brisbane Broncos.

Season summary 
The Bulldogs lost a tight match in round 1 against the 2003 premiers Penrith Panthers 24-22. The Bulldogs only lost 4 games in the first half of the season. Played 12, Won 8, Lost 4, Byes 1. The Bulldogs biggest up set in the first half of the season was when they played Newcastle Knights at EnergyAustralia Stadium in round 3 they lost 46-22. The Bulldogs most strongest performance in the first half of the season was in round 2 against Wests Tigers they defeated them 47-12. The Bulldogs second half of the season was the same as the first Played 12, Won 8 Lost 4 Byes 1. In round 13 Hazem El Masri became the top scored tries for the Bulldogs. The old record was 123 which was set by Terry Lamb. Hazem currently holds it with 128 tries. Hazem El Masri was only 4 point shy of hitting the 300 mark again in total point in a season as he did in 2004 with 342points. The Bulldogs went into the final on the back of some poor performances but that certainly didn't affect them, they were on top of the Canberra Raiders the entire match. Even in the miserable conditions it didn't affect them. The Bulldogs did what they do best stuck together and ripped in. The Bulldogs got the luxury of having a week off the following week. In the preliminary final against the Brisbane Broncos the Bulldogs showed some specular plays and tries in the first half and ended up winning the first half 20-6, but cannot say to much about the second half performance from the Bulldogs. The Bulldogs went down to the Broncos 37-20

Match results

Ladder

Crowds 
The Canterbury Bulldogs average crowd (not including finals) for 2006 was 18,211

All Games*: Played:26 Total: 481,219 Average: 18,508 Home Games: Played: 12 Total: 216,489 Average: 18,040 Away Games: Played:12 Total: 220,591 Average: 18,382 Finals*: Played: 2 Total: 44,139 Average: 22,069

Players (29)

Player movements 
Gains

Losses

Re-Signings

Footnotes 
 Woods B (2007). El Magic - The Life of Hazem El Masri. Harper Collins Publishing. 
 Andrews M (2006). The ABC of Rugby League. ABC Publishing. 
 Whiticker A & Hudson G (2005). Canterbury Bulldogs - The Encyclopedia of Rugby League Players. Bas Publishing. 
 Whittaker A & Collis I (2004). The History of Rugby League Clubs. 
 Lane D (1996). A Family Betrayal - One Man's Super League War - Jarred McCracken. Ironbark Publishing. 
 Chesterton R (1996). Good as Gould - Phil Gould's Stormy Life in Football. Ironbark Publishing. 
 Lester G (1991). The Bulldog Story.  Publishing. 
 Whiticker A (1992). The Terry Lamb Story. Gary Allen Publishing. 
 Tasker N (1988). Top-Dog - The Steve Mortimer Story. Century Hutchinson Publishing. 
 Lester G (1985). Berries to Bulldogs. Lester - Townsend Publishing. 
 NRL Official Information Handbook (2001–2007). Season Guide.
 Middleton D (1987–2006). The Official NSWRL, ARL, NRL Yearbook / Annual.
 Christensen EE (1946–1977). NSWRL Yearbook.
 Rugby League Review (2003–2007).
 Big League (1974–2007).
 Rugby League Week (1970–2007).
 The Rugby League News.

See also 
List of Canterbury-Bankstown Bulldogs seasons

External links 
 Official Bulldogs Website
 Official Bulldogs Team Store
 Bulldogs Statistics
 Back to Belmore - The Official Campaign Website

Canterbury-Bankstown Bulldogs seasons
Bulldogs RLFC season